Allen Kenneth Watson (born November 18, 1970) is an American former Major League Baseball left-handed starting pitcher who played for several teams between 1993 and 2000, and a current high school baseball coach.

Amateur career
Allen Watson was born in Jamaica, New York on November 18, 1970. He is a graduate of Christ The King Regional High School in Middle Village, New York and attended New York Institute of Technology. In 1990, he played collegiate summer baseball with the Falmouth Commodores of the Cape Cod Baseball League.

Professional career
Watson was picked by the St. Louis Cardinals in the first round of the 1991 Major League Baseball draft after completing his junior year at New York Tech. He was selected as a NCAA Division I All-American by the American Baseball Coaches Association as a designated hitter. He spent the next two years in the Cardinals' minor league system, making his Major League debut on July 8, 1993.

In 1995, the Cardinals traded Watson, Doug Creek, and Rich DeLucia, to the San Francisco Giants for Royce Clayton and Chris Wimmer. At the end of the 1996 season, the Giants traded Watson and Fausto Macey to the Anaheim Angels for J. T. Snow. He pitched with the Angels in 1997-1998, obtaining a career-high twelve wins as a starting pitcher in 1997. On June 14, 1997, Watson gave up the first-ever grand slam in interleague play, to Rich Aurilia of the San Francisco Giants.

Over the next three years, he played for the Seattle Mariners, New York Mets and New York Yankees, mostly in a relief role or as a spot starter.

New York Yankees (1999–2000)
On July 3, 1999 Watson signed with the New York Yankees. Watson was used as a reliever during his time with the Yankees, and had his best tenure with them, going 4–0 with a 2.10 ERA to finish the 1999 season. His play earned him a spot on the postseason roster, where he pitched one inning in the 1999 American League Championship Series against the Red Sox. Watson gave up two hits, two walks, and one strikeout as the Yankees defeated Boston. Watson did not pitch in the 1999 World Series. On November 5, 1999, he was granted free agency, but he re-signed with the Yankees on December 7.

In 2000, Watson's ERA ballooned to 10.23 and he appeared in only 17 games. He pitched 22 innings and did not record a win or loss, while finishing only 9 games for the team. Despite his dismal performance during the season, he was placed on the Yankees' postseason roster, but did not appear in any games. He won his second World Series when the Yankees defeated the Mets in five games. Watson later had surgery to repair his shoulder, which caused him to miss the entire 2001 season. Watson returned to the Yankees during spring training in 2002, but made only one start. He retired after spring training.

Post-baseball career
Watson is currently working as a personal pitching coach for prospective athletes in Queens and Long Island. He works primarily out of The Cage located on Metropolitan Avenue in Ridgewood. Watson also runs baseball clinics for all ages in Oceanside, New York at South Shore Sports Complex and at East Coast Sports Academy.  

On December 20, 2007, Watson was named in Jason Grimsley's affidavit as having used performance-enhancing drugs. Watson and Grimsley were teammates on the 1999-2000 New York Yankees. In a statement released by his agent, Watson denied these accusations by stating:

I at no time over my professional baseball career used steroids or any performance-enhancing drugs. Not then, not now, not ever.

Bagel incident
In their baseball memoir The Yankee Years, Joe Torre and Tom Verducci recount an incident where Watson was horsing around in the Yankee clubhouse and threw a bagel towards a clubhouse attendant, just as Yankee owner George Steinbrenner walked in. When the bagel hit Steinbrenner, he demanded to know who threw it. When Watson confessed, Steinbrenner remarked "I figured it was you, Watson. That's why it didn't hurt."

References

External links

1970 births
Living people
American expatriate baseball players in Canada
Anaheim Angels players
Arkansas Travelers players
Baseball coaches from New York (state)
Columbus Clippers players
Falmouth Commodores players
Gulf Coast Yankees players
Hamilton Redbirds players
Lake Elsinore Storm players
Long Island Ducks players
Louisville Redbirds players
Major League Baseball pitchers
Midland Angels players
NYIT Bears baseball players
New York Mets players
New York Yankees players
Sportspeople from Queens, New York
Baseball players from New York City
San Francisco Giants players
San Jose Giants players
Savannah Cardinals players
Seattle Mariners players
St. Louis Cardinals players
St. Petersburg Cardinals players
Tampa Yankees players
Vancouver Canadians players